Abdelhazzi Kamaradimo (born 10 April 1984 in Saint-Denis, Paris), was a French-born Mauritanian footballer. He was plays for Mauritanian national team.

International career
Kamara was a member of the Mauritania national football team.

References

External links

1984 births
Living people
Mauritanian footballers
French footballers
Mauritania international footballers
Mauritanian expatriate footballers
French expatriate sportspeople in Switzerland
French sportspeople of Mauritanian descent
AS Saint-Étienne players
Expatriate footballers in Romania
LB Châteauroux players
Ligue 1 players
FCV Farul Constanța players
Ligue 2 players
Association football defenders
FC Stade Nyonnais players
Expatriate footballers in Switzerland
Mauritanian expatriate sportspeople in Switzerland
French expatriate sportspeople in Romania
France youth international footballers
Mauritanian expatriate sportspeople in Romania
Canet Roussillon FC players
Sportspeople from Saint-Denis, Seine-Saint-Denis
Footballers from Seine-Saint-Denis